Barbara Joyce Bachmann (May 16, 1924 – January 31, 1999) was a lecturer at Yale University, UC Berkeley, Columbia and NYU, and is best known as director of the E. coli Genetic Stock Center and for publishing editions of the standard E. coli K-12 genetic linkage map.

Education 
She received her B.A. from Baker University in 1945, her M.S. from the University of Kentucky in 1947 and her Ph.D. from Stanford University in 1954.

Employment 
The E. coli Genetic Stock Center was established by Edward Adelberg at Yale University in 1971. Barbara Bachmann was initially hired as curator and later become director of the Center until her retirement in 1995. She was instrumental in both maintaining the strain collection but also standardizing the E. coli K-12 genetic map creating a common system for all K-12 researchers. She published 8 editions of the E. coli linkage map as well a pedigree of common K-12 strains. One of her publications of the E. coli linkage map in 1983 and 1991 became one of the most cited articles in all of biology those years.

Awards and honors 
Barbara Bachmann was honored with the J. Roger Porter Award in 1986 for her work curating the E. coli genetic stock center.

References

External links 
E.coli Genetic Stock Center

American women scientists
American microbiologists
Yale University faculty
Baker University alumni
University of Kentucky alumni
Stanford University alumni
1999 deaths